Křelovice is a municipality and village in Plzeň-North District in the Plzeň Region of the Czech Republic. It has about 200 inhabitants.

Administrative parts
Villages of Mydlovary, Pakoslav and Rozněvice are administrative parts of Křelovice.

Notable people
Willi Jäger (born 1940), German mathematician

References

Villages in Plzeň-North District